Ali and Nino is a 2016 British war film, based on Kurban Said's 1937 novel of the same name. The film is written by Christopher Hampton and directed by Asif Kapadia. It stars Maria Valverde and Adam Bakri.

Plot
During the Russian Empire, Ali and Nino fall in love. Ali is a Muslim from Azerbaijan who lives in the oil-rich city of Baku, in the family's Shirvanshir Palace. Nino is a Georgian Orthodox Christian whose wealthy Kipiani family also lives in Baku. Ali's friend, Malik, agrees to help bring the aristocratic parents to accept a marriage. World War I breaks out in Europe.

Malik and Nino go to the opera, while Ali and Nino agree to secretly meet afterward. Armenian Malik has also fallen in love with Nino and kidnaps her planning his own marriage to her. Prince Ali confronts and kills Malik with a dagger. Ali is injured during the fight and escapes to Dagestan to heal and hide out from Malik's powerful Nachararyan family. The Russian Revolution deposes Nicholas II of Russia.

Tamar is afraid no one will ever marry her daughter Nino and plans to send her to Moscow. Others have their own plans. Ever loyal Mustafa reunites Nino and Ali in the mountains.  After a night of lovemaking and with Nino's virginity gone, Ali yells out to call a Mullah. Mustafa assures the couple no priest is necessary for he can perform the marriage ceremony. Despite aristocratic childhoods, simple country life suits the newlyweds and they find true happiness. The Azerbaijan Democratic Republic wins its own independence.

Ali returns to Baku and gets appointed Deputy Foreign Minister. He begins to raise his young family in a free homeland. The young country signs friendship treaties with its neighbors but they fear the Bolsheviks in Russia.  Learning that the Russians have amassed 30,000 troops on the border, the Azerbaijan government flees by train. As Nino and their daughter head toward Paris, Ali jumps off the train and blows up the bridge. Nino is safe but Ali gets shot and killed defending his country.

Epilogue text states that Ali Khan Shirvanshir died aged 24, Prime Minister Fatali Khan was assassinated 6 weeks later, it was 71 years before, in 1991, Azerbaijan reclaimed its independence, and Nino and her daughter escaped to Paris, but never returned to Baku.

Cast
Adam Bakri (Palestinian) as Ali Khan Shirvanshir - Azerbaijani - Muslim
María Valverde (Spanish) as Nino Kipiani - Georgian - Christian
Riccardo Scamarcio (Italian) as Malik Nakhararyan - Armenian - Christian
Homayoun Ershadi as Safar Khan - Ali's father
Halit Ergenç as Fatali Khan Khoyski
Assaad Bouab as Ilyas Bey
Numan Acar as Seyid Mustafa
Ekin Koç as Mehmed Heydar
Connie Nielsen as Duchess Tamar Kipiani - Nino's mother
Mandy Patinkin as Duke Gregor Kipiani - Nino's father
Parviz Mamedrzayev as Qochu
Qurban Ismayilov as Kasi Mullah
Jumshud Zeynalov as Yayha Guli
Fakhraddin Manafov as Zeynalabdin Taghiyev
Nigar Gulahmadova as Sona Taghiyeva
Parviz Bagirov as Musa Naghiyev
Mehriban Zaki as Sultan Hanum
Rasim Jafarov as Ivan

Production
Most of the film was shot in Azerbaijan, Turkey, Georgia and Russia.

Reception
The film received mostly mixed-to-negative reviews. It holds a 40% rating on the film review aggregator website Rotten Tomatoes from a sample of 10 critics. On Metacritic, the film holds 50 out of a 100 score, based on 4 critics. The Los Angeles Times said, "Kapadia treats intimacy like exposition — time-passage updates mark every scene — leaving his leads to flounder against backdrops. There's zero chemistry or feeling to this sweeping, predictable endeavor, only the scent of what might have been." Godfrey Cheshire of RogerEbert.com gave Ali and Nino 2.5 out of 5, while CinaFilm gave the film 3 out of 5 (62%), based on 8 critical reviews.

Ken Jaworowski of The New York Times said that "[the film], adapted by Christopher Hampton (Atonement [and] Dangerous Liaisons) and shot in Azerbaijan and Turkey, rarely chooses a complex emotion when a straightforward one will do, though it does seek out ornate and grand images. Sure, beauty only gets you so far, but here that’s quite a long way".Ali and Nino was screened at the Sundance Film Festival where it was reviewed by Peter Debruge of the Variety Magazine'', who said that "in this uneven return to fiction filmmaking, 'Amy' director Asif Kapadia struggles to convey the sense of tragedy that has made his documentaries so powerful".

References

External links

2010s war films
Azerbaijani-language films
2010s English-language films
2010s Russian-language films
Films scored by Dario Marianelli
Films based on Azerbaijani novels
Films directed by Asif Kapadia
Films set in the 1910s
Films set in Baku
Films set in the Russian Empire
Films set in Tbilisi
Films shot in Azerbaijan
Films shot in Turkey
Russian Revolution films
World War I films set on the Eastern Front
Films set on the Russian Empire home front during World War I